Bruno Fournier (born 10 January 1967) is a Canadian former diver. He competed in the men's 10 metre platform event at the 1992 Summer Olympics.

References

External links
 

1967 births
Living people
Canadian male divers
Olympic divers of Canada
Divers at the 1992 Summer Olympics
Divers from Quebec City
Commonwealth Games medallists in diving
Commonwealth Games bronze medallists for Canada
Divers at the 1990 Commonwealth Games
20th-century Canadian people
Medallists at the 1990 Commonwealth Games